Joan Crawford (c. 1904–1977) was an American film actress.

Joan Crawford may also refer to:
Joan Crawford (basketball) (born 1937), American basketball player 
"Joan Crawford" (song), a 1981 song by Blue Öyster Cult